The 1997 Arab Super Cup was an international club competition played by the winners and runners up of the Arab Club Champions Cup and Arab Cup Winners' Cup. It is the fourth edition and was won by Egyptian side Al-Ahly. It was also the first time that the host team had not won the championship. OC Khouribga, the hosts, were runners up.

Teams

Results and standings

References

External links
Arab Super Cup 1997 - rsssf.com

1997
Arab 1997
1996–97 in Moroccan football
1996–97 in Egyptian football
1997 in Jordanian sport